James Drew may refer to:

 James Drew (1872–1944), Australian cricketer
 James B. Drew (1877–1953), Chief Justice
 J. B. C. Drew (James Brackett Creighton Drew, 1843–1924), Florida Attorney General
 James Syme Drew (1883–1955), decorated British Army officer